BLRT Grupp (Balti Laevaremonditehas) is a shipbuilding company headquartered in Tallinn, Estonia. In addition to Estonia, the company owns shipyards in Lithuania, Finland and Norway. Its shipbuilding and ship repair subsidiaries are Tallinn Shipyard, Vakarų laivų gamykla, Baltijos laivų statykla, Turku Repair Yard, and BLRT Fiskerstrand.

On 14 December 2011, Fiskerstrand BLRT delivered the world's largest LNG-powered ferry, MF Boknafjord, to Norwegian company Fjord1.  Another LNG-fired ferry, MF Edøyfjord, was delivered on 30 January 2012.

The total profit was 283.9 million euros in 2017, 302.2 million euros in 2018. Net profit was 18.5 million euros in 2017, 15.1 million euros in 2018.

References

External links
 Official website

Engineering companies of Estonia
Shipbuilding companies of Estonia
1912 establishments in Estonia
Companies based in Tallinn